

L

M

N

O 

 

L